TeXet is a Russian manufacturer of consumer electronics, based in Saint Petersburg. It is owned by Electronic Systems Alkotel.

Products

The company's flagship phone was the TM-5200, which was installed with the Yandex Opera Mini and Yandex Opera Mobile web browsers.

 X-Watch, a smartwatch (TW-120, TW-200), TW-300)
Smartphones
texet X-basic 2 TM-4272
 iX-maxi
Tablet computers
TM-7025
 X-Pad Style 7.1
Navipad TM-7049 3G
Dashcam
TeXet DVR-100HD

teXet also manufacturers feature phones, which have fewer features and are considered to meet operational security requirements approved by the General Staff of the Armed Forces of the Russian Federation.

External links

 English homepage

References

Companies based in Saint Petersburg
Electronics companies of Russia
Mobile phone manufacturers
Russian brands